Bump and run coverage is a strategy formerly widely used by defensive backs in American professional football in which a defender lined up directly in front of a wide receiver and tried to impede him with arms, hands, or entire body and disrupt his intended route. This originated in the American Football League in the 1960s, one of whose earliest experts was Willie Brown of the Oakland Raiders.  Mel Blount of the Pittsburgh Steelers specialized in this coverage to such a point as to cause numerous rule changes (see below) strictly limiting when and where a defender may make contact with a potential receiver in order to make it easier for receivers to run their routes and increase scoring.

In contrast, under NCAA rules, contact is allowed anywhere on the field as long as contact is in front of the defender and a pass is not in the air.

Technique 
This play works well against routes that require the receiver to be in a certain spot at a certain time. The disadvantage, however, is that the receiver can shed contact and get behind the cornerback for a big play. This varies from the more traditional defensive formation in which a defensive player will give the receiver a "cushion" of about 5 yards to prevent the receiver from getting behind him. In the NFL, a defensive back is allowed any sort of contact within the 5 yard bump zone except for holding the receiver, otherwise the defensive back can be called for an illegal contact penalty, costing 5 yards and an automatic first down, enforced since 1978, and known colloquially as the Mel Blount Rule.

See also 
 American football strategy

American football strategy
American football terminology